Medallion Foods Inc. is a snack-food producer in Newport, Arkansas. It owned by Shearer's Foods.

History 
Medallion Foods was established in Newport, Arkansas in 1987. It produces corn-based snack products.

The company was purchased by Ralcorp Holdings in 2005 for $101.8 million. Ralcorp was then purchased by ConAgra Foods.

In April 2014, Shearer's Foods acquired the company from ConAgra for $33.5 million.

References

Snack food manufacturers of the United States
Manufacturing companies based in Arkansas
Jackson County, Arkansas